Scallions (also known as green onions, and Spring Onions in the UK) are vegetables derived from various species in the genus Allium. Scallions generally have a milder taste than most onions and their close relatives include garlic, shallot, leek, chive, and Chinese onions.

Although the bulbs of many Allium species are used as food, the defining characteristic of scallion species is that they lack a fully developed bulb. Instead the Allium species referred to as scallions make use of the hollow, tubular green leaves growing directly from the bulb. These leaves are used as a vegetable and can be eaten either raw or cooked. Often the leaves are chopped into other dishes and used as garnishes.

Etymology and names
The words scallion and shallot are related and can be traced back to the Ancient Greek  as described by the Greek writer Theophrastus. This name, in turn, is believed to originate from the name of the ancient Canaanite city of Ashkelon.

Various other names are used throughout the world to describe scallions including spring onion, green onion, table onion, salad onion, onion stick, long onion, baby onion, precious onion, wild onion, yard onion, gibbon, syboe and shallot.

Varieties

Species and cultivars that may be used as scallions include
 A. cepa
 'White Lisbon'
 'White Lisbon Winter Hardy' – an extra-hardy variety for overwintering
 Calçot
 A. cepa var. cepa – Most of the cultivars grown in the West as scallions belong to this variety. The scallions from A. cepa var. cepa (common onion) are usually from a young plant, harvested before a bulb forms or sometimes soon after slight bulbing has occurred.
 A. cepa var. aggregatum (formerly A. ascalonicum) – commonly called shallots or sometimes eschalot.
 A. chinense
 A. fistulosum, the Welsh onion – does not form bulbs even when mature, and is grown in the West almost exclusively as a scallion or salad onion. 
 A. × proliferum – sometimes used as scallions

Germination 
Scallions generally take 7–14 days to germinate depending on the variety.

Culinary uses 

Scallions may be cooked or used raw as a part of salads, salsas or Asian recipes. Diced scallions are used in soup, noodle and seafood dishes, sandwiches, curries and as part of a stir fry. In many Eastern sauces, the bottom half-centimetre (quarter-inch) of the root is commonly removed before use.

In Mexico and the Southwest United States, cebollitas are scallions that are sprinkled with salt, grilled whole and eaten with cheese and rice. Topped with lime juice, they are typically served as a traditional accompaniment to asado dishes.

In Catalan cuisine, calçot is a type of onion traditionally eaten in a calçotada (plural: calçotades). A popular gastronomic event of the same name is held between the end of winter and early spring, where calçots are grilled, dipped in salvitxada or romesco sauce, and consumed in massive quantities.

In Japan, tree onions (wakegi) are used mostly as topping of Japanese cuisine such as tofu. 
 
In Nepal, scallion is used in different meat item fillings like momo (dumpling), choyla (meat intertwined with scallion and spices).

In China, scallion is commonly used together with ginger and garlic to cook a wide variety of vegetables and meat. This combination is often called the "holy trinity" of Chinese cooking, much like the mirepoix (celery, onions, and carrots) in French cuisine or the holy trinity in Cajun cuisine. The white part of scallion is usually fried with other ingredients while the green part is usually chopped to decorate finished food.

In Vietnam, Welsh onion is important to prepare dưa hành (fermented onions) which is served for Tết, the Vietnamese New Year. A kind of sauce, mỡ hành (Welsh onion fried in oil), is used in dishes such as cơm tấm, bánh ít and cà tím nướng. Welsh onion is the main ingredient in the dish cháo hành, which is a rice porridge used to treat the common cold.

In India, it is sometimes eaten raw as an appetizer. In north India, coriander, mint and onion chutney are made using uncooked scallions. It is also used as a vegetable with Chapatis and Rotis. In south India, spring onions stir fried with coconut and shallots (known as Vengaya Thazhai Poriyal in Tamil and Ulli Thandu Upperi in Malayalam) are served as a side dish with rice.

In Ireland, scallions are sometimes chopped and added to mashed potatoes, known as champ or as an added ingredient to potato salad.

In the southern Philippines, it is ground in a mortar along with  ginger and chili pepper to make a native condiment called wet palapa, which can be used to spice dishes or as a topping for fried or sun-dried food. It can also be used to make the dry version of palapa, when it is stir fried with fresh coconut shavings and wet palapa.

At the Passover meal (Seder),  Afghan Jews and Persian Jews strike one another with scallions before singing "Dayenu", thus re-enacting the whipping endured by the Hebrews enslaved by the ancient Egyptians. 

Scallion oil is sometimes made from the green leaves. The leaves are chopped and lightly cooked, then emulsified in oil that is then used as a garnish.

See also 

 Allium tricoccum
 Chives
 Leek
 Onion
 Shallot

References 

Asian vegetables
Cuisine of Northern Ireland
Leaf vegetables
Onions